Lower Chitral District is a district in Malakand Division of Khyber Pakhtunkhwa province in Pakistan.

Demographics 
At the time of the 2017 census the district had a population of 278,328, of which 143,676 were males and 134,637 females. Rural population was 228,548 (82.11%) while the urban population was 49,780 (17.89%). The literacy rate was 63.00% - the male literacy rate was 75.71% while the female literacy rate was 49.37%. 3,902 (1.40%) were from religious minorities, almost all of whom are followers of the indigenous animistic Kalash faith that was once the dominant faith in the district before the spread of Islam.

89.48% of the population spoke languages recorded as 'Other' on the census. Most of these spoke Khowar (or Chitrali), the dominant language of Chitral as a whole. A minority spoke Chitral Kalasha and Wakhi, with the Kalasha dominating several valleys and the Wakhis spread throughout the north of the district near the Afghan border. Pashto is spoken in the southeast of the district by 9.11% of the population.  There are some speakers of the Madaklasht dialect, a Persian dialect which is considered a mix of Dari and Tajik.

Administrative Divisions
 Chitral Tehsil
 Drosh Tehsil

Religious Demographics

References

Districts of Khyber Pakhtunkhwa
Lower Chitral District